A Spanish Fury (or the Spanish Terror) was one of a number of violent sackings of cities in the Low Countries, mostly by Spanish Habsburg armies, that occurred in the years 1572–1579 during the Dutch Revolt. In some cases the sack did not follow the taking of a city. In others the sack was ordered, or at least not restrained, by Spanish commanders after the fall of a city.

The most notorious Spanish Fury was the sack of Antwerp in November 1576. In English this, or the mutinous campaign of 1576 in general, tend to be what is meant by "Spanish Fury". In Dutch the term can include a wider range of sackings, in particular the city punishments of 1572. The events of the Spanish Fury contributed to the creation of an anti-Spanish sentiment in many parts of Europe.

Background: A decade of upheaval 

Several requests for relaxation of religious coercion in the Low Countries, including a petition by a covenant of noblemen in the winter of 1565–66, had been rejected. The summer then brought renewed violent outbursts of iconoclasm, in which  'Beeldenstorm'  Calvinists destroyed religious images in Catholic monasteries and churches. The Battle of Oosterweel in March 1567 was the first Spanish military response to the many riots, and a prelude to or the start of the Eighty Years' War.
The Spanish King's captain-general Alba, the Iron Duke, with 10,000 men made the first military use of the Spanish Road. He was granted powers exceeding those of the king's half-sister Margaret of Parma, who had manoeuvred both Granvelle and William the Silent of Orange to the background while trying to reconcile local priorities with Spanish orders. Upon their meeting, judging the duke's inflexibility on extreme positions, the duchess resigned. He replaced her as governor-general of the Seventeen Provinces, and unlawfully instituted the Council of Troubles in September of that same year. This court-martial style tribunal often sentenced political opponents and religious Reformists to death; the more than 1,000 executions caused it being called the 'Council of Blood'.

The Sea Beggars, having been driven out of English harbours by Elizabeth I, captured Brielle on 1 April 1572. This foothold triggered anti-royalist rebellion in the Counties of Zeeland and of Holland. Other cities in the Low Countries that showed signs of rebellion against increased taxation and prosecution of Protestants, or did not allow troops of either side in,
became vigorously forced into Catholicism and total political obedience to the Spanish Crown.

Spanish Furies

By underpaid military under regular command
Looting a conquered town was not uncommon, and Governor Alba took it a step further by intentionally setting horrifying examples against sympathy for the rebels.
The Spanish Fury at Mechelen was the earliest event that became known by this term. After Orange's lieutenant Bernard of Merode had taken the city and controlled Mechelen for a month, he and his men left because a much stronger Spanish force was coming. Despite welcoming the latter by singing psalms of penitence in a gesture of surrender, from 2 October 1572, under command of Governor Alva's son Fadrique, three days long the city was sacked by his slaughtering, raping and pillaging troops. Alva reported to King Philip II (who later imprisoned him) that "no nail was left in the wall".
The Army of Flanders that had sacked Mechelen reconquered Diest and Roermond, marched on to Guelders and in November easily regained Zutphen, which had been taken for Orange in June. Don Fadrique ordered his men to kill the garrison and allowed them to murder and plunder the city. After the Spanish Fury at Zutphen, the counties to its north capitulated.
By December at Naarden in Holland, the inhabitants negotiated their surrender but the city was sacked and burnt down, and only 60 people survived the Massacre of Naarden.<ref
 name=SEE-BIBLIOGRAPHY_AR-sub3 />
The Spanish Fury at Haarlem, in 1573, following the half-year-long Siege of Haarlem

By December 1573, high yet ineffective financial expenditures, and complaints about the sheer cruelty of the governor's expeditions, led Philip II to Requesens, where he replaced Alba, who returned to Spain. The notorious 'Council of Blood' ordered no more executions, and was already in June 1574 officially abolished by Requesens, but remained in session until the Summer of 1576.

In October 1576, during the city of Maastricht's rebellion against its fortress because of continued heavy payments, German soldiers of the Spanish garrison followed city council orders and stood aside. While some Spanish troops held out at one of the gates, others fled with the garrison's commander Francisco de Montesdoca to his  minor fortification at Wyck just across the River Maas bridge. Though Montesdoca was offered safety during negotiations, he was arrested in the heat of this dispute. He was liberated while soldiery arriving from Dalem and those of Wyck captured the city. As few Spanish lives had been lost, the Germans were excused but had to make camp in neighbouring villages.
The Spanish Fury of October 1576 refers to the subsequent punishment of the city with a pillaging bloodbath.<ref
 name=SF1-Maastricht_1 />

By abandoned military on looting expedition
Upon Requesens' death in March 1576, the Spanish king appointed his own half-brother Don Juan as Governor-General of the Netherlands, but hesitated several months before notifying him. Even then, Don Juan did not hurry to proceed to Netherlands. The abandoned officers and ordinary soldiers were not being paid, and started a mutinous looting campaign.
The Spanish Fury at Aalst, a city that had always been loyal, showed that the military insurgencies that had occurred more than occasionally since 1573, had totally run out of hand by July 1576. Rampant soldiers sacked about 170 places in the County of Brabant.<ref
 name=SF1-Maastricht_1 />
The Spanish Fury at Antwerp, the most famous event by this name, also known as the Sack of Antwerp, occurred when the forces coming from Aalst and those from Maastricht met in November 1576. A thousand buildings were torched and as many as 17,000 men, women and children killed.

Aftermath
The Pacification of Ghent by which both Calvinists and Catholics decided to expel all Spanish troops, and for which negotiations had been going on since the sack of Aalst, was signed a few days after Antwerp's fate.<ref
 name=SEE-BIBLIOGRAPHY_MO-sub1 />
It was acceded to on 12 February 1577 by governor-general Don Juan when he signed the Perpetual Edict. A few months later, despite the agreed terms, Don Juan began planning a new campaign against the Dutch rebels, who found an ally in England's Elizabeth I.
Though never recognized by Philip, an arrangement by Catholics put his nephew Matthias of Austria, Duke of Burgundy and Brabant, in the position of governor of the Netherlands until 1581.<ref
 name=SF-Mechelen_3 />

By uncontrolled victorious military
Alexander Farnese, son of Margaret of Parma, reconquered a large part of the Netherlands by methods found honourable by friend and foe. Thereupon the Union of Arras was signed and only weeks later, on 23 January 1579, the Union of Utrecht, at which the separation between southern and northern Netherlands became a fact. But the War was not finished.

Between 12 March and 1 July 1579 both sides suffered hard in the siege of Maastricht.
The victorious attackers then held a second Spanish Fury at Maastricht which killed all but 400 people out of a population of 30,000.

See also
Letters from the Segovia Woods
Martyrs of Gorkum

Notes

References

Bibliography
 Or, if and while it is (again) available, the most relevant chapter only:

 Chapters VI, VII, XV, XIX, and XXII

 Vol. I 1555–66, II 1566–74, and III 1574–84

External links
 – A (northern) Dutch recount of the 16th century retated to the Seventeen Provinces

Vol. I 1552–65, II 1566, III 1567–72, IV 1572–74, V 1574–77, VI 1577–79, VII 1579–81, VIII 1581–84, Suppl., Cont.
German translation: 
 (See also the book's article on this Wikipedia)

 (In particular Part I; A reformist point of view)

Eighty Years' War (1566–1609)
Massacres in the Netherlands
Spanish war crimes